Marina Valeryevna Shamayko (born 3 August 1987) is a former tennis player from Russia.

On 30 September 2013, she reached her career-high singles ranking of world No. 317. On 14 July 2008, she peaked at No. 197 in the doubles rankings. In her career, Shamayko won one singles title and five doubles titles on the ITF Women's Circuit.

ITF finals

Singles: 5 (1–4)

Doubles: 28 (5–23)

References

External links
 
 

1987 births
Living people
Russian female tennis players
20th-century Russian women
21st-century Russian women